The 2012 Belmont Stakes was the 144th running of the Belmont Stakes and the race was won by Union Rags ridden by jockey John Velazquez. It was broadcast in the United States by NBC. The post time was scheduled for 6:35 p.m. EDT (10:35 p.m. UTC). 

The race was run without a Triple Crown at stake as Kentucky Derby and Preakness Stakes winner I'll Have Another was scratched from the race due to a leg injury.  The field was announced on June 8, 2012.

The official attendance was 85,811.

Payout 

The Belmont Stakes Payout Schedule

 $2 Exacta: (3–9) paid  $31.40
 $2 Trifecta: (3–9–4) paid  $496.00
 $1 Superfecta: (3–9–4–1) paid  $1906.00

Field
The winner of the Kentucky Derby and the Preakness Stakes, I'll Have Another, was declared in the race but was scratched due to a leg injury. Dullahan, third in the Kentucky Derby; and Union Rags, seventh in the same race, were also declared. 

Dullahan started the 5/2 favorite.

Margins – neck,  lengths
Time – 2:30:42
Track – Fast

See also
2012 Kentucky Derby
2012 Preakness Stakes

Notes and references

External links
Official website

2012
Belmont Stakes
Belmont Stakes
2012 in sports in New York (state)